Waqt may refer to:

 The time schedule for Muslim prayers, see Salat times
 Waqt (1965 film), a 1965 film directed by Yash Chopra
 Waqt: The Race Against Time, a 2005 film directed by Vipul Amrutlal Shah and starring Amitabh Bachchan
 Waqt News, Pakistani news channel